Jessica Hawkins (born 16 February 1995 in Headley, East Hampshire) is a British racing driver and stunt driver from East Hampshire, England. She currently competes in the W Series, as well as the British Touring Car Championship.

Biography
Hawkins made her professional motorsport début in British Formula Ford at Silverstone, in a one-off event where she twice finished inside the top ten. Her strong rookie performance saw her being picked up by Falcon Motorsport to contest the 2015 MSA Formula Championship. She had to wait until the fourth round of the championship at Oulton Park to make her debut, and only completed half of the ten-round championship – finishing 11th twice and placing 23rd in the championship. In an attempt to keep her single-seater dreams alive, she entered the Bahrain round of the 2015–16 MRF Challenge but finished 15th in both races.

In 2016 Hawkins moved into single-make racing, competing in the Volkswagen Racing Cup series. She crossed over to the Mini Challenge in 2017, scoring six class wins and finishing runner-up to Matt Hammond in the Pro division. Hawkins returned to the VW Cup in 2018, spending most of that year working as a stunt driver on Fast and Furious Live. In 2019 she moved to the newly-formed women-only W Series, where she was 11th after two points finishes in the last two races of the season. In 2020, after the cancellation of the W Series season, Hawkins made her debut in the 2020 British Touring Car Championship racing for Power Maxed Racing in Snetterton Circuit. She qualified in 22nd place where she stayed during Race 1. During Race 2, she made up one place to take P21, and then in Race 3, she climbed another position to take 20th place.

Hawkins continued working as a stunt driver in 2021, featuring on James Bond film No Time to Die. On 19 May, she was announced as the driver ambassador for the Aston Martin Cognizant F1 Team. She returned to W Series for the second edition of the championship, once again placing 11th in the standings, with 4 points finishes between the Hungarian and US races, including a 5th place finish in Zandvoort, and would also make a one-off return to the BTCC at Snetterton when asked to take over the Ford Focus of Andy Neate when he elected to sit out the event.

Hawkins holds the 0-100 MPH lawnmower record.

Hawkins is currently in a relationship with Abbie Eaton, also a British racecar driver.

Racing record

Career summary

Complete W Series results
(key) (Races in bold indicate pole position) (Races in italics indicate fastest lap)

† Did not finish, but was classified having completed 90% of the race distance.

Complete British Touring Car Championship results
(key) (Races in bold indicate pole position – 1 point awarded just in first race; races in italics indicate fastest lap – 1 point awarded all races; * signifies that driver led race for at least one lap – 1 point given all races)

References

External links

Profile at Driver Database
Official website

British racing drivers
English racing drivers
English female racing drivers
1995 births
Living people
Sportspeople from Hampshire
W Series drivers
British Touring Car Championship drivers
LGBT racing drivers
Mini Challenge UK drivers
British F4 Championship drivers
MRF Challenge Formula 2000 Championship drivers